Amalzari is a village in Belgaum district in the eastern state of Karnataka, India.

References

Villages in Belagavi district